Kendal is a small town in Hanover Parish in western Jamaica. More specifically, Kendal is located between Grange and Cessnock near the Westmoreland/Hanover border.

Geology
Limestone containing red bauxite has been reported in Kendal.

In literature
The children's fiction writer Cyril Palmer set several of his books in his hometown Kendal.

See also
 Railway stations in Jamaica

References

External links
 
 

Populated places in Hanover Parish
Populated places in Jamaica